I-184 (originally I-84) was an Imperial Japanese Navy Kaidai type cruiser submarine of the KD7 sub-class commissioned in 1943. During World War II, she operated in the Aleutian Islands and the Central Pacific Ocean before she was sunk with all hands by a United States Navy torpedo bomber during the Battle of the Philippine Sea in June 1944.

Design and description
The submarines of the KD7 sub-class were medium-range attack submarines developed from the preceding KD6 sub-class. They displaced  surfaced and  submerged.

For surface running, the submarines were powered by two  diesel engines, each driving one propeller shaft. When submerged, each propeller was driven by a  electric motor. The submarines could reach  on the surface and  underwater.

The submarines were armed with six internal  torpedo tubes, all in the bow. They carried one reload for each tube for a total of 12 torpedoes. They were originally intended to be armed with two twin-gun mounts for the  Type 96 anti-aircraft gun, but a  deck gun for combat on the surface was substituted for one 25 mm mount during construction.

Construction and commissioning
I-184 was laid down by the Yokosuka Naval Arsenal at Yokosuka, Japan, as Submarine No. 162 on 1 April 1942. She soon was named I-84, then was renamed I-184 on 20 May 1942. She was launched on 12 December 1942 and completed and commissioned on 15 October 1943.

Service history

October 1943–January 1944
On the day of her commissioning, I-184 was attached to the Sasebo Naval District and assigned to Submarine Squadron 11 in the 1st Fleet, an element of the Combined Fleet. Submarine Squadron 11 was reassigned to the 6th Fleet, another element of the Combined Fleet, on 25 November 1943.

On 28 January 1944, I-184 got underway from Kure, Japan, to test-launch the new Mark 1 naval mine. She was reassigned to Submarine Squadron 22 in the 6th Fleet on 31 January 1944.

Aleutian Islands

On 25 February 1944, I-184 received a temporary assignment to the Northeast Area Unit for duty in northern waters. She departed Sasebo, Japan, on 26 February 1944, visited Ōminato in northern Honshu from 29 February to 4 March 1944, and made an overnight stop at Paramushiro in the northern Kuril Islands from 11 to 12 March 1944 before beginning a war patrol in the waters of the Aleutian Islands. After an uneventful patrol, she called at Ōminato from 9 to 11 April 1944 before proceeding to Yokosuka, which she reached on 13 April 1944.

Central Pacific

I-184 departed Yokosuka on 20 May 1944 to carry food and supplies to the starving Japanese garrison on Mili Atoll in the Marshall Islands. She arrived at Mili on 12 June 1944, unloaded her cargo, and got back underway the same day. 

On 13 June 1944, amid indications of an imminent American invasion of the Mariana Islands, the commander-in-chief of the Combined Fleet, Admiral Soemu Toyoda, activated Operation A-Go for the defense of the Marianas. The same day, the commander of the 6th Fleet, Vice Admiral Takeo Takagi, ordered all submarines under his command to deploy in the central Pacific Ocean east of Marianas as part of the defense.

The Marianas campaign began with American amphibious landings on Saipan on 15 June 1944. With the Battle of Saipan underway, Takagi′s ability to command the 6th Fleet from the fleet's headquarters on Saipan was disrupted, and command of the fleet passed to the commander of Submarine Squadron 7, Rear Admiral Noboru Owada, at Truk Atoll in the Caroline Islands. On 15 June, Owada ordered I-184 to proceed to Saipan. That day, I-184 acknowledged the order and reported her estimated time of arrival at Saipan as 00:22 Japan Standard Time on 18 June. The Japanese never heard from her again.

Loss

The Battle of the Philippine Sea began on 19 June 1944 as Japanese naval forces moved to attack the American landing force at Saipan and the United States Fifth Fleet engaged the approaching Japanese. There were no survivors.

On 12 July 1944, the Imperial Japanese Navy declared I-184 to be presumed lost with all 96 hands in the vicinity of Saipan. The Japanese struck her from the Navy List on 10 August 1944.

Notes

References
 
 
 
 

1942 ships
Ships built by Yokosuka Naval Arsenal
Kaidai-class submarines
World War II submarines of Japan
Maritime incidents in June 1944
World War II shipwrecks in the Philippine Sea
Ships sunk by US aircraft
Japanese submarines lost during World War II
Ships lost with all hands